The 12523/24 New Jalpaiguri - New Delhi SF Express is a superfast express connecting the Indian cities of New Delhi, the capital of India and Siliguri, the largest metropolis of North Bengal.
This train directly originates from New Jalpaiguri Junction and terminates at New Delhi. 
This train connects the Eastern and Northern parts of India, covering the states of West Bengal, Bihar & Uttar Pradesh.

Accommodations
This train comprises 1 AC 2-Tiers, 2 AC 3-Tiers, 12 Sleepar Class, 5 Unreserved General Compartment, 1 Pantry car & 2 Luggage/Parcel cum Brake van which is provided with the Guards' cabin.
Total coach composition is 23.

Timetable 
 12523 New Delhi - New Jalpaiguri SF Express (Saturday)

 12523 New Jalpaiguri-New Delhi SF Express (Tuesday, Saturday)

See also
Barauni – Guwahati Line
New Jalpaiguri Chennai SuperFast Express
New Jalpaiguri–Howrah Shatabdi Express
New Jalpaiguri Digha Flag Express
New Jalpaiguri Howrah AC Express
New Jalpaiguri Sealdah Darjeeling Mail
New Jalpaiguri−Amritsar Karmabhoomi Express
New Jalpaiguri Sitamarhi Express
New Jalpaiguri-Sealdah Padatik Express

References

External links
    Indian Railway Website
 Indian Rail Info Forum
Indian Railway Fan Club

Transport in Jalpaiguri
Transport in Delhi
Transport in Siliguri
Express trains in India
Rail transport in West Bengal
Rail transport in Uttar Pradesh
Rail transport in Bihar
Rail transport in Delhi
Railway services introduced in 2010